Jim R. Johnston is an American television director and actor.

He is best known for his directing work on Babylon 5 and Tour of Duty."

Filmography

Television

References

External links

American television directors
Living people
Year of birth missing (living people)